Mashmakhan/The Family is a 1995 album by the Canadian rock band Mashmakhan, compiling both of their early 1970s albums.

Production 
Mashmakhan debuted in 1970 with three singles, "As the Years Go By", "Gladwin" and "Days When We Are Free", which were compiled into their self-titled debut album. Mashmakhan later launched their second album, The Family in 1971, which had little-to-no success, Mashmakhan started to realise that fact, and broke up shortly after. In 1995, both of the albums, were compiled into one compact disc for the first time. However, the last track of The Family, "Mr. Tree", was cut off due to time restraints.

Track listing

Reception 

The album was well received by critics, receiving a four and a half out of five star review from Allmusic. Allmusic critic and writer Keith Pettipas stated in his review, "Looking back, Mashmakhan was ahead of their time; they did progressive rock for a commercial audience," while progressive rock is primarily used for underground music. Pettipas went on and said Mashmakhan incorporated "flutes and strings" when "hard rock was dominant" and they were "one of the first Canadian acts to become international stars."

Personnel 
 Rayburn Blake – guitar, vocals
 Pierre Senecal – guitar, keyboards, saxophone, vocals, wind, woodwind
 Brian Edwards – bass, vocals
 Jerry Mercer – drums, vocals

References 

1995 compilation albums
Mashmakhan albums